The coat of arms of Vilnius is the coat of arms of the city of Vilnius, Lithuania. It is also used as coat of arms of Vilnius city municipality. The modern version was created in 1991 by Arvydas Každailis, the same artist who drew the modern coat of arms of Lithuania. The design is based on the oldest seals of the Vilnius City Council dating back to the 14th century.

There is a great version and a small version. The great version incorporates the small version, which depicts Saint Christopher (sometimes also called Saint Christophorus) with the infant Jesus on his shoulder. This coat of arms was originally given to Vilnius in 1330. It was speculated that in pagan times, i.e., until the end of the 14th century, it featured Titan Alkis, a hero of ancient Lithuanian tales, carrying his wife Janterytė on his shoulders across the Vilnia River.

The great coat of arms bears the Latin motto "UnitasJustitia – Spes" ("UnityJusticeHope"). The words are echoed by objects held by the shield supporters: the axe and tied rods represent unity; the scale, justice; and the anchor, hope.

The coat of arms was abolished under the Lithuanian SSR. It was reinstated after Lithuania declared its independence from the Soviet Union in 1990.

Flag
The flag of Vilnius has the arms in the centre.

References

Sources

External links

1991 establishments in Lithuania
Vilnius
Culture in Vilnius
History of Vilnius
Vilnius
Vilnius
Vilnius
Vilnius